Women & Children's Hospital of Buffalo (1892–2017) was a children's hospital in Buffalo, New York. It was a pediatric facility serving patients in Western New York and parts of Southern Ontario. It was a teaching hospital loosely affiliated with the State University of New York at Buffalo. The hospital treated infants, children, teens, and young adults aged 0–21 and also had extensive women's health facilities.

History

The hospital was founded in 1892 as The Children's Hospital of Buffalo. During the first year of operation, so many patients were turned away for lack of space that in 1893 the hospital was forced to increase the capacity by 40 beds. During the next few decades, the hospital renovated and added modern medical equipment, and by the 1950s, hospital had about 200 pediatric beds and 75 beds for women and bassinets. Over the years the hospital was recognized many times by U.S. News & World Report for its leading national pediatric programs. After a merger with Kaleida Health, the facility was renamed Women & Children's Hospital of Buffalo (WCHOB). The hospital was then closed in 2017 when the newly built Oishei Children's Hospital opened on the Buffalo Niagara Medical Campus (about one mile from WCHOB).

References

Hospital buildings completed in 1892
Children's hospitals in the United States
Teaching hospitals in New York (state)
Healthcare in Buffalo, New York
Buildings and structures in Buffalo, New York